Detective Willy is a 2015 comedy adventure film directed by Jose Maria Cabral. The film opens in the Dominican Republic and Puerto Rico in the summer of 2015. It features performances by Fausto Mata, Denise Quiñones, Anthony Alvarez, Crystal Jimenez, Hector Anibal, Kenny Grullón, Manuel Chapuseaux, Christian Alvarez, Josue Guerrero, Patricia Ascuasiati and others. The film premiered June 25, 2015.

Synopsis 
Willy Echevarria (Fausto Mata) is a policeman in a small town in the Dominican Republic. He's also a fan of and yearns to be like the leads of classic film noir. After being fired in a bumbled operation with his bad cop partner Bruce Garcia (Anthony Alvarez), Willy has a chance to restore his career by finding a historical artifact that mysteriously went missing from a national museum.

Cast
 Fausto Mata as Willy Echevarria
 Denise Quiñones as Ela Rayuela
 Anthony Alvarez as Bruce Garcia
 Crystal Jimenez Vicens as Jael Diaz
 Hector Anibal
 Kenny Grullón
 Manuel Chapuseaux
 Christian Alvarez
 Patricia Ascuasiati
 Josue Guerrero
 Endry Sckely

References

External links

2015 films